Progress in Polymer Science is a peer-reviewed scientific journal publishing review articles on topics broadly related to polymer chemistry. The 2021 impact factor of this journal was 31.281, ranking it the highest in the subject category "Polymer Science". The journal is available since 1967. Currently it is edited by Editor-in-Chief Jean-Francois Lutz and Senior Editors Michael Bockstaller and Chuanbing Tang. Honorary Editors-in-Chief include Krzysztof "Kris" Matyjaszewski and Guy C. Berry from Carnegie Mellon University.

References

Chemistry journals
Materials science journals
English-language journals
Elsevier academic journals